Blandford Forum, commonly Blandford, is a market town in Dorset, England, sited by the River Stour about  northwest of Poole. The town's civil parish had a population of 10,355 at the 2021 census.

Blandford is notable for its Georgian architecture, the result of rebuilding after the majority of the town was destroyed by a fire in 1731. The rebuilding work was assisted by an Act of Parliament and a donation by George II, and the rebuilt town centre—to designs by local architects John and William Bastard—has survived to the present day largely intact.

The town's economy is based on a mix of the service sector and light industry. It is the base of the Royal Corps of Signals, the communications wing of the British Army, and the site of the Royal Signals Museum.

History
Blandford has been a fording point on the River Stour since Anglo-Saxon times. The name Blandford derives from the Old English blǣge, and probably means ford where gudgeon or blay are found. The name Blaneford or Bleneford is recorded in the Domesday Book, referring not to Blandford Forum itself but to the adjacent villages of Bryanston and Blandford St Mary on the opposite side of the ford, and Langton Long Blandford further downstream.

By the 13th century, the settlement on the north bank of the river had become a market town with a livestock market serving the nearby Blackmore Vale with its many dairy farms. At the start of the 14th century it returned two members of parliament and was also known as Cheping Blandford, where Cheping or Chipping refers to a market. The Latin translation Forum was first recorded in 1540.

In Survey of Dorsetshire, written by Thomas Gerard of Trent in the early 1630s, Blandford was described as "a faire Markett Towne, pleasantlie seated upon the River ... well inhabitted and of good Traffique". In the 17th-century English Civil War Blandford was a Royalist centre; most inhabitants supported the king.

In the 18th century Blandford was one of several lace-making centres in the county; Daniel Defoe stated that lace made in the town was "the finest bonelace in England... I think I never saw better in Flanders, France or Italy". In the 17th and 18th centuries Blandford was also a malting and brewing centre of some significance.

Almost all of Blandford's buildings were destroyed on 4 June 1731 by the "great fire", which was the last of several serious fires that occurred in the 16th, 17th and 18th centuries. The fire began in a tallow chandler's workshop on a site that is now The King's Arms public house. Within a few hours, almost 90% of the town's fabric had gone; all fire-fighting equipment had been lost to the fire and the church's lead roof had melted. Even properties west of the river in Blandford St Mary and Bryanston were burned, though notable buildings that survived in the town include the Ryves Almshouses and Dale House in Salisbury Street, Old House in The Close, and much of East Street. An Act of Parliament was introduced that stated that rebuilding work must be in brick and tile and should begin within four years. With assistance from the rest of the country—including £1,000 given by King George II—the town was rebuilt over the next ten years to the designs of local architects John and William Bastard. Bottlenecks were removed and streets realigned in the new town plan, which also provided a wider market place. As well as residential and commercial property, new buildings included a new town hall, school and church. The redesigned town centre has survived to the present day virtually intact.

After the post-fire reconstruction Blandford remained a thriving market town. Wool spinning and button making were also significant, and the brewing and hostelry trades expanded. The turnpike road between Salisbury and Dorchester was made in 1756 and passed through the town, and the arrival of the coaching era increased the town's prosperity, though the built fabric of the town changed little until the first half of the 19th century, when houses for wealthier inhabitants were built to the north alongside the roads to Salisbury and Shaftesbury. Later in the 19th century, perhaps following the installation of piped water, more densely packed buildings were built to the northeast, replacing gardens and barracks for the poor (that had been erected following the fire) between the roads to Salisbury and Wimborne Minster. Rail transport arrived in Blandford in the 1860s, though this did not impact greatly on the town's economy.

Blandford's weekly animal market disappeared in the 20th century, perhaps a casualty of motorised transport that enabled larger markets to be held in fewer centres (the market at nearby Sturminster Newton increased significantly). By the middle of the 20th century Blandford Fair, a seasonal sheep fair held in summer and autumn, had also disappeared, due to changes in animal husbandry and a reduction in sheep numbers in the county.

Governance
In the United Kingdom national parliament, Blandford is in the North Dorset parliamentary constituency whose current Member of Parliament (MP) is Simon Hoare of the Conservative party. At the top tier of local government Blandford is governed by Dorset Council, which provides all services apart from those provided by Blandford Forum Town Council, which has responsibilities that include outdoor fitness and play areas, CCTV, the cemetery and allotments, venue hire, the indoor market, grass cutting and grit bins.

For electoral purposes Blandford is divided into four electoral wards: Blandford Central, Blandford Hilltop, Blandford Langton St.Leonards and Blandford Old Town. A fifth ward, Riversdale and Portman, covers Bryanston and Blandford St Mary west of the river; these are not within the parish of Blandford, but the town's built-up area extends into Blandford St Mary parish. In national parliamentary elections these five wards are joined with 22 others that together elect the Member of Parliament for the North Dorset constituency. In town council elections Blandford's four wards together elect thirteen councillors to Blandford Forum Town Council; Blandford Central ward elects seven councillors, and the other three wards each elect three. The mayor of Blandford for 2022 - 2023 is Colin Stevens.

Geography
It is sited in the valley of the River Stour, mostly on rising ground northeast of the river, but with some development south of the river at Blandford St Mary. The underlying geology is Cretaceous chalk bedrock that in places is overlain by Quaternary drift: alluvium in the river's flood plain, head deposits around the town's south-west, south and south-east borders, and clay with flints at the highest part of the town in the north. The town is almost surrounded by land that has been designated as having landscape value of national significance: the Dorset Area of Outstanding Natural Beauty (AONB) to the west and the Cranborne Chase and West Wiltshire Downs AONB to the north and east.

Architecture
Most of the buildings in Blandford's centre are Georgian, due to the rebuilding after the 1731 fire and the absence of subsequent change. Pevsner stated that "hardly any other town in England can be compared with it". A 1970 report by Donald Insall Associates described Blandford as "the most complete and cohesive surviving example of a Georgian country town in England", with the Market Place area in particular given the status of "An Area of National Importance" and described as "a brilliant master piece" [sic]. Buildings that have received Grade I listing by English Heritage are the parish church of St Peter and St Paul, the town hall and corn exchange, The Old House, Coupar House, Pump House, and several buildings in Market Place: numbers 18, 20 and 26, and the old Greyhound Inn. All the listed structures in Market Place, including the church and another seventeen buildings with either Grade II or Grade II* status, form a group, together with several listed properties in West Street and East Street.

The parish church of St Peter and St Paul was built between 1732 and 1739 and is a classical building with a cupola on top of the tower. The design by John Bastard originally specified that the tower would have a steeple, but lack of money resulted in the wooden cupola instead, a decision that disgusted Bastard, who stated that "it will not keep the wett nor the weather out". Sir Frederick Treves was not a fan of the church's appearance, describing it in his 1906 Highways & Byways in Dorset as "ugly, and only tolerable from a distance". The interior remains relatively unaffected by Victorian interference and retains its font, pulpit, box pews and Mayoral seat. The pulpit, originally designed for St Antholin's in London, is by Sir Christopher Wren. The organ, dating from 1794, is by George Pike England and is the most intact of his surviving works; it allegedly had been intended for the Savoy Chapel in London, but was too big, so George III supposedly gave it to Blandford instead. In 1893 the church was enlarged by moving the apsidal sanctuary out on rollers onto new foundations and building a new chancel behind it. The Victorians did install galleries to accommodate an increasing congregation, though these were removed in the 1970s, a change that Pevsner called "a visual blessing".

Blandford Forum Town Hall occupies a site in the Market Place close to the site that was occupied by its predecessor. It dates from 1734 and has a two-storey three-windowed frontage of Portland stone ashlar. The ground floor has three semi-circular arches leading to an open portico or loggia, called The Shambles, that used to be part of the market. Toward the back of the building is the old corn exchange, a late 19th-century assembly hall with "interesting elliptical roof-trusses".

Coupar House, dated around 1750, is the largest private house in Blandford that dates from the post-fire period. It has a richly decorated interior with a notable staircase, and is unique among the town's private dwellings for having Portland stone dressings to its brick façade, though the design of this frontage has been described as "curiously amateurish" with "little attention ... paid to rules of proportion".

The Old House was probably built some time between 1650 and 1670 by a German doctor who practised in Blandford after graduating from The Queen's College, Oxford. Its unusual design, which includes a steep hipped roof with wide spreading eaves, has elements of artisan style popular at the time, though it was described by John Hutchins as "an architectural graft from the 'fatherland' planted by the worthy doctor on the soil of his adopted country".

Pump House fire monument was built by John Bastard in classical style to commemorate the fire. It dates from 1760, is of Portland stone and stands adjacent to the churchyard wall. The inscription on its rear wall states its purpose is "... to prevent by a timely Supply of Water, (with God's Blessing) the fatal Consequences of FIRE hereafter". In 1768 Bastard provided an endowment of £600. The monument was repaired in 1858 and the pump was replaced by a fountain in 1897.

To the south of the town a six-arch stone bridge spans the River Stour; it is built mostly of greensand with some heathstone and was extensively restored in 1726. The water meadows between it and the town are crossed by a causeway and two smaller bridges.

Demography
The 2021 census recorded a parish population of 10,355. At the 2011 census, Blandford Forum civil parish and the small neighbouring parish of Langton Long Blandford had a combined population of 10,325. The built-up area of Blandford extends south of the River Stour into the civil parish of Blandford St Mary; in 2013 the population of Blandford St Mary and Blandford Forum civil parishes combined was estimated as 12,110.

Previous census returns for the town show that it had a population of less than 4,000 until 1981, after which it increased rapidly; in the 2001 census, the town had 4,524 dwellings and a population of 8,760, of whom 96.5% were White British. Some of the population increase however can be accounted for by a boundary change which incorporated housing estates that already existed but were previously within a different parish (Pimperne) on the town's northern side. Previous census figures for the town's civil parish are shown in the table below:

Economy
Important sectors in Blandford's economy include public administration, education and health (41% of non-agricultural employment), distribution, accommodation and food (25% of non-agricultural employment) and production and construction (19% of non-agricultural employment). In 2012 there were 3,900 people working in the town, 55% of whom worked full-time and 45% part-time. Between July 1997 and July 2013 the unemployment rate for residents of working age varied between 0.5% and 2.5%. There are five industrial estates and business parks in and around the town: Blandford Heights Industrial Estate (9.47 hectares or 23.4 acres), Holland Way Industrial Estate (7.32 hectares or 18.1 acres), Sunrise Business Park (5.6 hectares or 14 acres), Uplands Industrial Park (1.34 hectares or 3.3 acres) and Clump Farm Industrial Estate (1.30 hectares or 3.2 acres). These are sited mostly toward the bypass road to the north-east of the town. In 2009 there were 370 firms providing employment in the town.

Major government employers in the town include the Environment Agency and Dorset Council, whose offices on Salisbury Road were until 2019 the home of North Dorset District Council. Blandford Camp incorporates a modern technology training college.

Major retail employers in the town include the Co-op (previously Somerfield) and Tesco, though in 2015 the Co-op site was sold to Marks & Spencer, which opened a food hall. Other national chains with a presence in the town include Iceland, Boots, Homebase and WHSmith. An outdoor market takes place every Thursday and Saturday, and there is a bi-weekly indoor market held in the Corn Exchange.

Other important employers in the town include Damory Coaches, the brewing company Hall and Woodhouse, Hospital Metalcraft, metal tube manipulators Iracroft Ltd, trolley maintenance company KJ Pike & Sons, Signpost Housing Association, Wessex Homes Park and Leisure Ltd.

Transport

Blandford lies at the junction of the A350 and A354 main roads but is skirted by an eastern bypass. The main road running through the town is the B3082, connecting Blandford Forum to Wimborne Minster. Buses run from the town to locations including Poole, Bournemouth, Salisbury and Shaftesbury with the primary operator being Wilts & Dorset.

From 1860 to 1966,  was a stop on the Somerset and Dorset Joint Railway, which ran from Bath to Bournemouth, though until the bridge was built over the river Stour, opening in 1863, the Dorset Central section of the line terminated at the hamlet of Blandford St. Mary. Blandford Forum railway station, along with the whole line, closed to passengers in 1966. The station was immortalised in 1964 in the song "Slow Train" by Flanders and Swann.

Blandford Camp was served by a short-lived three-mile branch line, which left the main line just north of the river bridge. This operated intermittently from 1918 to 1928.

Education
Blandford Forum has two primary schools: Archbishop Wake and Milldown. A new Archbishop Wake school, built on the old St Leonards Middle School site at the bottom of Black Lane, opened in November 2008. The other feeder schools for The Blandford School are Blandford St Mary, Downlands, Dunbury and Durweston, Pimperne, and Spetisbury Primary Schools. Pupils move at the age of 11 to The Blandford School, which is a secondary school lying in the west of Blandford; the school also has a sixth form.

A number of private schools are also located near Blandford, such as Bryanston School, Canford School, Clayesmore School, Hanford School, Knighton House School and Milton Abbey School.

Art, culture and media
Blandford Georgian Fayre, a one-day celebration of the town's Georgian heritage, is held in the town centre every year in the first week of May. The event includes cultural presentations, stalls, historical re-enactments, music and dancing, and a fun fair on the meadows along the banks of the River Stour. The town also hosts an annual carnival and the Great Dorset Steam Fair is held at nearby Tarrant Hinton.

There are three museums in Blandford and its vicinity: Blandford Town Museum in Bere's Yard, Blandford Fashion Museum in The Plocks, and the Royal Signals Museum at Blandford Camp military base. Blandford Town Museum has no admission charge but is not open on Sundays or during the winter. It has artefacts from the history of the town and the surrounding area, and a small Victorian garden that was created in 2008. Blandford Fashion Museum has collections of fashions between the early 18th century and the 1970s; it is also closed in the winter. The Royal Signals Museum contains items relating to the history of the Royal Corps of Signals and military communication since the Napoleonic Wars.

In 1590, Edmund Spenser mentioned the Stoure flowing through the town in The Faerie Queene.

Blandford features in Thomas Hardy's novels as the Wessex town of Shottesford Forum.

Blandford Forum railway station which is now gone – the train line to Blandford was removed in the 1960s – was mentioned in the 1963 song Slow Train by Flanders and Swann.

BFBS Radio broadcasts across Blandford on 89.3FM from a studio at the military base as part of its UK Bases network. Local television news is provided by BBC South Today and ITV Meridian.

Sport and leisure
Blandford Forum has a Non-League football club, Blandford United F.C., who play at Blandford Recreation Ground. Blandford Bowls Club play in several men's and women's leagues and have a six rinks green, also on the recreation ground on Milldown Road. Blandford Cricket Club has three men's teams that play in divisions in a local county league, plus several youth teams that compete in the North Dorset Junior leagues. The club has its own cricket ground at the top of Whitecliff Mill Street. Blandford Rugby Football Club are based at facilities beside the leisure centre at The Blandford School.

Community facilities
Blandford Community Hospital on Milldown Road provides minor and day surgery, occupational therapy, outpatient and community rehabilitation services, palliative care, community mental health services and physiotherapy. Blandford Library, located on The Tabernacle, has music and feature films for hire as well as books, and has internet access and reference works available.

Public open spaces in Blandford include Park Road Recreation Ground, which has football and cricket pitches and associated pavilions, and Larksmead Playing Field, which has two rugby pitches, and is the home of Blandford Rugby Club. There are also local authority controlled football and rugby union pitches at The Blandford School in Milldown Road. Next to the main post office in the town centre is Woodhouse Gardens, a small public garden that contains a pavilion that can be hired for events.

Natural history

The Blandford fly (Simulium posticatum), a small (2–3 mm) biting fly belonging to the family Simuliidae or "blackflies" lives in the area. In recent years the weed beds in the river have been sprayed to reduce numbers.

Blandford Elm (Ulmus glabra Huds.  'Superba') is a (now rare) very large-leaved wych cultivar, first raised by nurseryman Gill of Blandford Forum in the early 1840s, and distributed by nurseries in the UK, Europe and the USA.  Only one specimen is known to survive (2020), in Edinburgh.

Notable residents
Blandford is the birthplace of three eighteenth-century bishops: William Wake (1657–1737), Archbishop of Canterbury; Thomas Lindesay (1656–1724), Archbishop of Armagh; and Samuel Lisle (1683–1749), Bishop of Norwich.

Frederick Abberline (1843–1929), the former chief inspector for the London Metropolitan Police during the hunt for Jack the Ripper, was born in Blandford. The composer and organist Albert Mallinson (1878–1946) lived in Blandford.  The music hall performer Sam Cowell (1820–1864) died in the town, and is buried there.

The sculptor Alfred Stevens (1817–1875), who created the Duke of Wellingtons monument in St Paul's Cathedral, was born in Blandford, as were Reginald Heber Roe (1850–1926), the first vice-chancellor of the University of Queensland, and the surgeon Sir Alfred Downing Fripp. Sir Roy Welensky (1907–1991), Prime Minister of the Federation of Rhodesia and Nyasaland from 1956 until 1963, lived in Blandford from 1981 until his death.

Twin towns

Blandford Forum is twinned with:

 Mortain, France
 Preetz, Germany

References

Notes

General references

 
 Blandford Forum Information at Dorset County Council (pdf) – Accessed January 2006

External links

 Blandford Forum Town Council

 
Towns in Dorset
Civil parishes in Dorset
North Dorset District
Georgian architecture in England